New North may refer to:

New North Church (disambiguation)
New North Road (disambiguation)
New North Zone, in Chongqing, China
The New North, a business consortium in northeast Wisconsin, US
Acton–Northolt line, historically known as the New North Main Line

See also
Xinbei (disambiguation) (lit. New North)